Nirsu Narain College Singhara (NNC Singhara or N N College) is a college located in Singhara, Vaishali district, Bihar, India. Established in 1981, it is approved by University Grants Commission, permanently affiliated to B. R. Ambedkar Bihar University and partially aided by the Government of Bihar.

References

Universities and colleges in Vaishali district
Educational institutions established in 1981
1981 establishments in Bihar